Martin John Earp (born 6 September 1872) was an English professional footballer who played in the Football League for Everton, Nottingham Forest, Stockport County and The Wednesday. Earp was the captain of The Wednesday side who beat Wolverhampton Wanderers in the 1896 FA Cup Final.

Jack Earp was the brother of Fred Earp who also played for Nottingham Forest.

References

1872 births
Year of death missing
Date of death unknown
English footballers
Association football defenders
English Football League players
Nottingham Forest F.C. players
Everton F.C. players
Corinthian F.C. players
Sheffield Wednesday F.C. players
Stockport County F.C. players
FA Cup Final players